Massachusetts required a majority for election.

See also 
 United States House of Representatives elections, 1798 and 1799
 List of United States representatives from Massachusetts

United States House of Representatives elections in Massachusetts
Massachusetts
United States House of Representatives
Massachusetts
United States House of Representatives